Jake Tony Sinclair (born 29 November 1994) is an English footballer who has played professionally for Southampton and Hibernian. He is currently a striker for Mangotsfield United.

Career
Sinclair joined Southampton at the academy level at the age of eight years. He made his professional debut for Southampton's first-team on 27 August 2013 against Barnsley at Oakwell Stadium in the Football League Cup in which he came on in the 90th minute for Emmanuel Mayuka as Southampton won the match 5–1.

On 1 September 2014, Sinclair joined Scottish Championship club Hibernian on a season-long loan. He returned to Southampton on 12 January.

On 30 June 2015, Southampton opted against offering Sinclair a new contract and therefore he was released with five other players.

On 7 December 2015, Sinclair joined Southern Premier League side Frome Town. Five days later, he made his debut in the 60th minute of a 1–0 defeat to King's Lynn Town.

On 29 August 2016, Sinclair joined Hereford. On 12 May 2017, it was announced that he would leave upon the expiry of his contract.

Personal life
Jake Sinclair is the younger brother of former Celtic player Scott Sinclair and also the brother of Martin Sinclair, a British Paralympic 7-a-side player.

Honours

Club
Southampton 
 U21 Premier League Cup: 2014–15

References

External links 

Jake Sinclair at Footballdatabase

1994 births
Sportspeople from Bath, Somerset
Living people
English footballers
Association football forwards
Southampton F.C. players
Hibernian F.C. players
Frome Town F.C. players
Hereford F.C. players
Scottish Professional Football League players
Southern Football League players